is a Japanese football player as a striker and currently play for Júbilo Iwata.

National team career
In October 2009, Sugimoto was elected Japan U-17 national team for 2009 U-17 World Cup. He played all 3 matches and scored a goal against Brazil in the first match. In October 2102, he was elected Japan U-23 national team for 2012 Summer Olympics. He played 4 matches and Japan won the 4th place.

In September 2017, Sugimoto was elected Japan national team for 2018 World Cup qualification. At this qualification, on 5 September, he debuted against Saudi Arabia.

Club statistics
.

National team statistics

International goals
Scores and results list Japan's goal tally first.

Honours

Cerezo Osaka
J.League Cup : 2017

Individual
J.League Best XI : 2017

References

External links

Kenyu Sugimoto at Cerezo Osaka official site 
Profile at Cerezo Osaka
Kenyu Sugimoto  at Yahoo! Japan sports 

1992 births
Living people
Association football people from Osaka Prefecture
Sportspeople from Osaka
Japanese footballers
Japan youth international footballers
J1 League players
J2 League players
Cerezo Osaka players
Tokyo Verdy players
Kawasaki Frontale players
Urawa Red Diamonds players
Yokohama F. Marinos players
Júbilo Iwata players
Olympic footballers of Japan
Footballers at the 2012 Summer Olympics
Association football forwards
Japan international footballers